David Swift (born 1987) is an English writer and historian.

Swift studied history at Girton College, University of Cambridge. His work focuses on left-wing activism and on different 'identities', such as class, race and gender. Swift has written for a variety of newspapers and periodicals including the New Statesman, Tribune (magazine),  The Times, The Independent and UnHerd.

Swift's first book, a history of the British Left during the First World War, was described by reviewer Prof Peter Stansky as ‘an important contribution to the ever-fascinating subject of the history of the British left [and] the development of the Labour party’.

Swift's second book, A Left for Itself, was the first analysis of 'political hobbyism' in the UK, and focused on what he termed 'performative radicalism' in the era of the internet and social media. It was heralded as a definitive analysis of the failure of Jeremy Corbyn's Labour party at the 2019 United Kingdom general election.

In 2022 Swift published his third book, The Identity Myth, which interrogated common understandings of different 'identities' such as class, race, gender, and generation. It was a Next Big Idea Club finalist for 2022.

Works
For Class and Country: the Patriotic Left and the First World War (2017)
A Left for Itself: Left-wing Hobbyists and Performative Radicalism (2019)
The Identity Myth: Why We Need to Embrace our Differences to Beat Inequality (2022)

References

Living people
1987 births
21st-century British non-fiction writers
21st-century English people
Alumni of Girton College, Cambridge
British historians
Labor historians